This is a list of the National Register of Historic Places listings in Burleson County, Texas.

This is intended to be a complete list of properties listed on the National Register of Historic Places in Burleson County, Texas. There are two properties listed on the National Register in the county. Both properties are also designated as Recorded Texas Historic Landmarks.

Current listings

The locations of National Register properties may be seen in a mapping service provided.

|}

See also

National Register of Historic Places listings in Texas
Recorded Texas Historic Landmarks in Burleson County

References

Burleson County, Texas
Burleson County